Angel Padrón (born 22 August 1953) is a Cuban basketball player. He competed in the men's tournament at the 1976 Summer Olympics.

References

1953 births
Living people
Cuban men's basketball players
Olympic basketball players of Cuba
Basketball players at the 1976 Summer Olympics
Place of birth missing (living people)